Gilbert Laverne "Gibby" Welch (December 24, 1904 – February 10, 1984) was an American football player who played college football for the University of Pittsburgh. He broke Red Grange's single season yardage record in 1926 and was an All-American in 1927.  He later played professional football for the New York Yankees in 1928 and the Providence Steam Roller in 1929.

Early years
Welch was born in Parkersburg, West Virginia, and attended Parkersburg High School, where he was successful in football, basketball and track.  Welch next attended Bellefont Academy, before enrolling at the University of Pittsburgh in 1924.  He played three seasons of football at Pitt from 1925–1927, including the first game ever played at Pitt Stadium.  Welch also ran track for Pitt in 1926, 1927 and 1928.  He was one of the country's leading college discus throwers, and also competed in the shot put, javelin and broad jump.  Welch was the captain of the football and track teams as a senior.  He was the signal-calling left halfback in the single-wing offense run by coach Jock Sutherland in 1926 and 1927.

In 1926, Welch broke the single-season yardage record set by Red Grange, gaining 1,964 yards in just nine games.  Welch was described as "one of the most dazzling open field sprinters in the collegiate ranks," an athlete whose "sensational runs are aided by his excellent use of twirls and pivots through an open field."

1927 season
He was unanimously selected as an All-American at the halfback position in 1927 by, among others, the Associated Press, United Press, Collier's Weekly, Central Press Association, Hearst newspapers, New York Sun, Billy Evans, and the Walter Camp Football Foundation.  Highlights of Welch's 1927 All-American season include the following:
 In a 21-13 win over Nebraska, Welch took the opening kickoff and ran 84 yards for a touchdown.  In the second quarter of the same game, Welch caught a long forward pass and then "twisted and squirmed his way 71 yards down the field for another score." 
Welch also had a 105-yard kickoff return for a touchdown against West Virginia in 1927.  His 105-yard return was the longest run of the year in college football.  
In late November 1927, Welch had another big game in a 30-0 win over Penn State.  One newspaper writer noted that Welch "ripped the Penn State line to shreds, bent the Lion ends almost double with his wide sweeping runs, and kicked and passed in almost uncanny form when necessary."  
Welch also led Pitt to their first bowl game, the 1928 Rose Bowl game against Stanford.  In a 7-6 Stanford win, Welch was held to 50 yards, as one reporter noted: "Gibby Welch, Pitt's All-American halfback, was a tower of strength for his alma mater, but Stanford had been coached to watch the stocky halfback who made eastern grid circles buzz this season."

Professional football
Welch also played professional football for the New York Yankees in 1928 and the Providence Steam Roller in 1929.  He signed with the Steam Roller after the Yankees disbanded.  A newspaper story announcing his signing by the Steam Roller noted:"'Gibby', who was once known to have been addressed as Gilbert, functions effectively as a punter, pass dispatcher or receiver, line perforator and broken field runner.  It is understood that the Roller management was forced to quote the highest figures ever whispered into a pro football player's ears before Welch affixed his signature to a contract.  'Gibby' was thrown on the open market by the recent dissolution of the New York Yankees."

Later years
After leaving professional football, Welch worked as a football coach at Morris Harvey College in 1931.   He later became a leading real estate man and businessman in Parkersburg, West Virginia.

In 1948, Welch gained attention when he was charged with felonious assault with intent to kill with a deadly weapon.  Welch was charged with beating his third wife, Gladys Welch, after two months of marriage in November 1948.

In 1956, the Charleston Daily Mail called Welch "one of the most fabulous characters ever produced in West Virginia athletics."  As of 1968, Welch's career total of 4,108 total yards was still a school record at Pitt.  Welch's rushing records at Pitt stood for more than 50 years until they were broken by Tony Dorsett in the 1970s.

References

	

1904 births
1984 deaths
All-American college football players
American football halfbacks
Charleston Golden Eagles football coaches
Coaches of American football from West Virginia
College men's track and field athletes in the United States
Parkersburg High School alumni
Sportspeople from Parkersburg, West Virginia
Sportspeople from Pittsburgh
Pittsburgh Panthers football players
Players of American football from Pittsburgh
Players of American football from West Virginia
Providence Steam Roller players
Track and field athletes from Pennsylvania
Track and field athletes from West Virginia